QEP may refer to:

 Quadrature encoder pulse, in a rotary encoder
 Query plan or query execution plan, in a database software system
 Quadratic eigenvalue problem, a special case of nonlinear eigenproblem in mathematics
 QEP Resources, a defunct American energy company.